Paul Émile Debraux (30 August 1796 – 12 February 1831), commonly known simply as Émile Debraux, was a French writer, goguettier, poet and singer. He was born in Ancerville, Meuse and died 1831 in Paris.

Notes 

French chansonniers
19th-century French singers
19th-century French poets
1796 births
1831 deaths
People from Meuse (department)
Burials at Père Lachaise Cemetery